Carl-Oskar Bohlin (born 8 January 1986) is a Swedish politician for the Moderate party.  Since 18 October 2022, he is the Minister for Civil Defence in the Ulf Kristersson cabinet.

References

1986 births
Government ministers of Sweden
Living people
Members of the Riksdag 2022–2026
Members of the Riksdag from the Moderate Party